Serwitut  is a small village in the administrative district of Gmina Złoczew, within Sieradz County, Łódź Voivodeship, in the central area of Poland.

References

Villages in Sieradz County